HMAS Arrow (P 88) was an  of the Royal Australian Navy (RAN).

Design and construction

The Attack class was ordered in 1964 to operate in Australian waters as patrol boats (based on lessons learned through using the s on patrols of Borneo during the Indonesia-Malaysia Confrontation), and to replace a variety of old patrol, search-and-rescue, and general-purpose craft. Initially, nine were ordered for the RAN, with another five for Papua New Guinea's Australian-run coastal security force, although another six ships were ordered to bring the class to twenty vessels. Propulsion machinery consisted of two 16-cylinder Paxman YJCM diesel engines, which supplied  to the two propellers. The ship's company consisted of three officers and sixteen sailors. Main armament was a bow-mounted Bofors 40 mm gun, supplemented by two .50-calibre M2 Browning machine guns and various small arms. The ships were designed with as many commercial components as possible: the Attacks were to operate in remote regions of Australia and New Guinea, and a town's hardware store would be more accessible than home base in a mechanical emergency.

Arrow was built by Walkers Limited at Maryborough, Queensland, launched on 17 February 1968, and commissioned on 3 July 1968.

Operational history
Arrow was transferred to the Melbourne Division of the Royal Australian Navy Reserve in mid-1968, then was returned to active service in the early 1970s.

Fate
During Cyclone Tracy on 25 December 1974, Arrow was driven ashore and sank at Stokes Hill Wharf in Darwin with the loss of two sailors.

Memorial 
On 24 April 2019 a memorial, to HMAS Arrow and the sailors that lost their lives, was unveiled at the Royal Flying Doctor Service and The Bombing of Darwin Tourist Facility at Stokes Hill Wharf by two surviving crew members and family of the two sailors that died.

See also

Citations

References

Attack-class patrol boats
Ships built in Queensland
Maritime incidents in 1974
Shipwrecks of the Northern Territory
1968 ships
Cyclone Tracy